Ludvig Olav Larsen (10 March 1883 – 31 January 1948) was a Norwegian rifle shooter who competed at the 1924 Summer Olympics in Paris.

References

1883 births
1948 deaths
Norwegian male sport shooters
ISSF rifle shooters
Olympic shooters of Norway
Shooters at the 1924 Summer Olympics
Sportspeople from Hamar